The 1999 Tri Nations Series was the fourth Tri Nations Series, a rugby union tournament contested by the men's national teams of Australia, New Zealand and South Africa. It was contested from 10 July to 28 August 1999. New Zealand won the title, winning three of their four matches, including both against South Africa; however, they split the series against Australia, who retained the Bledisloe Cup, having won it outright the previous year.

Table

Results

External links
Tri Nations at Rugby.com.au

Tri Nations
The Rugby Championship
Tri
Tri
Tri Nations